The 2015 Tiburon Challenger was a professional tennis tournament played on outdoor hard courts. It was the ninth edition of the tournament which was part of the 2015 ATP Challenger Tour. It took place in Tiburon, United States between 26 September and 4 October 2015.

Singles main draw entrants

Seeds

 1 Rankings are as of September 21, 2015.

Other entrants
The following players received wildcards into the singles main draw:
  André Göransson
  Chase Buchanan
  Deiton Baughman
  Mackenzie McDonald

The following players received entry into the singles main draw courtesy of a protected ranking:
  Peter Polansky

The following players received entry into the singles main draw as a special exempt:
  Alex Kuznetsov

The following players received entry into the singles main draw as an alternate:
  Dimitar Kutrovsky

The following players received entry from the qualifying draw:
  Dennis Nevolo
  Henri Laaksonen
  Nicolas Meister
  Sekou Bangoura

Champions

Singles

  Tim Smyczek def.  Denis Kudla, 1–6, 6–1, 7–6(9–7).

Doubles

   Johan Brunström /  Frederik Nielsen def.  Carsten Ball /  Matt Reid, 7–6(7–2), 6–2.

External links

Tiburon Challenger
2015 in American tennis
2015 in sports in California